() is a county-level city in northeastern Ningde prefecture-level city, on Fujian's border with Zhejiang province.

History
Fuding county was established during the Qing Dynasty in 1739 AD.

On December 15, 1950, the Matsu Administrative Office of Fujian Province, Republic of China was established including modern-day Lienchiang County (the Matsu Islands), ROC (Taiwan) as well as islands in present-day Haidao Township, Xiapu County and Taishan in Fuding's Shacheng.

Administrative
Fuding was promoted to county-level city status in 1995.  With a population of 290,850. The city oversees 3 street committees, 1 development zone, 10 towns and 3 townships, of which one is zoned Affirmative action-like for the city's native She people.

Geography
The city is mountainous and has a good deal of seacoast. Fu'an City lies to the west and Xiapu County to the south. North and east lie counties in Wenzhou, Zhejiang province.

Subdistricts

 Shanqian
 Tongshan
 Tongcheng

Development area
 Long'an Development Area

Towns

 Guanling
 Panxi
 Yushan
 Bailin
 Shacheng
 Guanyang
 Dianxia
 Diantou
 Qinyu
 Qianqi

Townships

 Jiayang
 Dieshi

Ethnic Townships

 Xiamen She

Climate

Culture
The region mostly speaks Eastern Min natively. There is a Puxian Min (Hinghwa) speaking community in Fuding.

Transport
Fuding City is located in the strategic region between northeast Fujian and southern Zhejiang provinces. The main road No. 104 pass through Fuding City. Fuding City is also home to the deep sea port Shacheng. The port enables large ships to come to Shacheng port which in turn leads to increase economic activity and trade.

The opening of the full-line of Wenfu High Speed Railway on September 28, 2009, improved the transportation conditions. Wenfu and Yongtaiwen High Speed Railway cut the travel time of Fuding–Fuzhou to 1.5h, Fuding–Wenzhou to 0.5h and Fuding–Shanghai to 5h.

A ferry service operates across Shacheng Bay, connecting the somewhat isolated town of Shacheng to the Long'an Development Area (the port for Dianxia Town).

With the construction of taimu international airport in future, fuding will be more and more open to the outside world.

Attractions

Taimu Mountain
The Taimu Mountain are one of the more famous tourist spots. Known as the "wonderland on the sea", it sports many high and steep mountains, spectacular rock formations, secluded caves, a foggy climate, and additional rivers and parks.

Yushan Island
Yushan Island is a small tourist island that has rolling grassland and beautiful views of hills and lakes. It is sometimes referred to as the "Heavenly Mountain in South China".

References

External links

 

Cities in Fujian
County-level divisions of Fujian
Ningde